Arin was a Yeniseian language spoken in Russia along the Yenisei River between Yeniseysk and Krasnoyarsk. It is classified as a Southern Yeniseian language, along with Pumpokol, Kott, and Assan.

It is believed that the term Ar or Ara was used by speakers of Arin to refer to themselves. It became extinct in the 18th century.

The closest known relative of Arin, Pumpokol, has been suggested to be the language of the ruling elite of the Xiongnu, as well as the Jie ruling class of the Later Zhao dynasty.

References

External links
 Arin basic lexicon at the Global Lexicostatistical Database

Extinct languages of Asia
Yeniseian languages
Languages extinct in the 18th century